Raymond Saunders is a Canadian clockmaker who has designed and built more than 150 customized clocks that mainly serve as tourist-attracting public artworks. In 1977 he was commissioned to build a steam clock for the Gastown district of Vancouver, Canada. The Gastown clock may be the first steam clock ever built, although there is evidence that 19th century British engineer John Inshaw made a steam clock after which was named a Birmingham pub. Saunders has since built six different public steam clocks for clients such as the city of Otaru, Japan, and the Indiana State Museum. He has also built a clock for Vancouver's York House School's 78th birthday in 2010.

In 2019 Ray was badly injured in a fall, and has been semi-retired since.

See also
Steam clock

References

Canadian clockmakers
Living people
Year of birth missing (living people)